Y10  may refer to:
 Autobianchi Y10, a city car manufactured by the Italian automaker Fiat from 1985 to 1996
 LNER Class Y10, a class of 0-4-0 geared steam locomotives built by Sentinel Waggon Works
 LNER Class Y10 (Wheatley), a class of 0-4-0 steam tender locomotives of the North British Railway
 Shanghai Y-10, a four engined commercial passenger jet aircraft developed in the 1970s